The 2015 Zabadani ceasefire agreement between Syrian opposition forces and the Syrian Armed Forces was achieved on 24 September 2015, with mediation from the United Nations, following the Battle of Zabadani (2015). The agreement was fulfilled in April 2017.

Agreement
On 24 September 2015, more than 2 months after the Battle of Zabadani (2015) began, the UN announced that an agreement between the warring parties had finally been reached after repeated mediation efforts. Per the agreement, the remaining entrenched rebels are to withdraw from the Syrian government-besieged Zabadani and control of the town to the Syrian government while surrendering all weapons, save for light handguns, and withdrawing to the Idlib Governorate. Conversely, civilians (approximately 10,000 people) still remaining inside the rebel-besieged Shia villages of Fu'ah and Kefriya are to be evacuated. Control of the villages would not be surrendered to the rebels; however, as approximately 4,000 pro-government troops would remain in the villages. The plan was expected to take 6 months to be fully implemented, during which time extended ceasefires are expected to be upheld in each respective area. Evacuation of wounded from both sides was expected to begin as early as 25 September 2015. An additional stipulation denotes the release of 500 rebel captives from Syrian government-held prisons. The agreement would be overseen by the United Nations office in Damascus.

Implementation timeline

On 26 September 2015, the first bus transport evacuating the rebel combatants to Idlib began leaving al-Zabadani.

After the implementation of the ceasefire, the besieging Hezbollah and the Syrian Army troops redirected their attention towards the remaining parts of the Qalamoun Mountains still under rebel control, namely a smaller area in the Jaroud Rankous, located in southern Qalamoun, and larger area located in Jaroud Qarah, in northern Qalamoun. The Hezbollah also set itself out to recapture the Lebanese border-district of Arsal, from where the al-Nusra Front and ISIL have been receiving much of its reinforcement into the Qalamoun Mountains. However, on 10 October, the truce was jeopardized by rebel groups, claiming the truce had been made "irrelevant" following the Russian military intervention in the Syrian Civil War.

On 28 December, 120 rebels and civilians from Zabadani were transported to Lebanon in return for the evacuation of 300 pro-government troops and civilians from Fuah and Kefraya to Turkey. According to the ceasefire agreement, those from Zabadani will proceed to Turkey through Lebanon while those from Fuah and Kefraya will arrive in government-held Syria through Lebanon and Turkey.

A year later on 25 September 2016, 52 aid trucks went to Zabadani and Madaya and 19 arrived in Fuah and Kefraya. A week before on 18 September, Hezbollah and the Syrian Army destroyed a rebel smuggling tunnel near Zabadani containing rockets, mortar shells, and other weapons and ammunition.

On 23 November 2016, government forces launched mortar shells and sniper fire into Zabadani and Madaya, which killed 2 civilians.

On February 21, 2017, Rebel forces evacuated from the town of Serghaya.

On 28 March 2017, an agreement was brokered by Qatar and Iran for the evacuation of those living in Fu'ah and Kafriya in exchange for the evacuation of residents and rebels in Zabadani and Madaya. The agreement came under effect beginning on 12 April and buses and ambulances arrived in the four towns with the assistance of the Syrian Arab Red Crescent to begin the evacuations. On 14 April, 60 buses transported 2,350 people, including 400 rebels, from Madaya and Zabadani to Idlib. After being suspended for several days following a suicide bombing of buses carrying refugees, the first phase of the evacuations was completed on 19 April, with further transports planned for June. A total of 30,000 people are to be relocated by the end of the operation.

See also 

Battle of Zabadani (2012)
Qalamoun offensive (May–June 2015)
Siege of al-Fu'ah and Kafriya
Siege of Darayya and Muadamiyat
 Geneva II Conference on Syria
 Syrian conflict peace proposals
 International reactions to the Syrian Civil War

References 

Zabadani cease-fire 2015
Zabadani cease-fire 2015
International reactions to the Syrian civil war
2015 in Syria
Middle East peace efforts
Syrian peace process
September 2015 events in Syria